Koch Peak is the one of the taller mountains in the Madison Range in the U.S. state of Montana. The summit is located in Lee Metcalf Wilderness within Gallatin and Beaverhead-Deerlodge National Forests. Koch Peak is tallest in a group of summits collectively called the Taylor Peaks.

References

Mountains of Madison County, Montana
Mountains of Montana